In 1995, the main means of transportation in Moldova were railways and a highway system ( overall, including  of paved surfaces). The major railway junctions are Chișinău, Bender, Ungheni, Ocnița (Oknitsa, in Russian), Bălți, and Basarabeasca (Bessarabka, in Russian). Primary external rail links connect the republic's network with Odessa (in Ukraine) on the Black Sea and with the Romanian cities of Iași and Galați; they also lead northward into Ukraine. Highways link Moldova's main cities and provide the chief means of transportation within the country, but roads are in poor repair. The country's major airport is in Chișinău.

Shipping is possible on the lower Prut and Nistru rivers, but water transportation plays only a modest role in the country's transportation system. In 1990 a total of 317 million tonkilometers of freight were carried on inland waterways as compared with 15,007 million ton-kilometers on railways and 1,673 million ton-kilometers on roads.

The movement of manufactured goods and of passengers on all means of transportation started to decline in 1989. From 1993 to 1994, for example, the total amount of transported goods fell by 31 percent, passenger traffic decreased by 28 percent, and the number of passengers declined by 24 percent. The main causes for these declines are the high cost of transportation, a lack of fuels, and the poor state of Moldova's transportation infrastructure: approximately 20 percent of Moldova's roads are considered in a critical technical state.

Railways 
 

total:

broad gauge:
 of  gauge (2005)
The entire length of the Moldovan railway network is single track and not electrified. Much of the railway infrastructure is still in a poor state, all of the rolling stock being inherited from the former Soviet Union.

However, substantial investments have been made in building new railway lines since 2003, with the goal of connecting Chișinău to southern Moldova and eventually to the Giurgiulești oil terminal. The first such segment was the  Revaca–Căinari line, opened in 2006.

Connections exist to Ukraine at Kuchurhan, Mohilyv-Podil's'ky, Ocnița. The track between Basarabeasca and Reni crosses the border back and forth. The Kuchurhan crossing as well as the Tighina–Tiraspol–Kuchurhan segment are under the control of the Transnistrian separatist authorities, the circulation of trains on the route depending on the level of political tensions between the separatists and the Government of Moldova.

Between Moldova and Romania there is a break-of-gauge (Romania employing standard gauge). The most important crossing (including gauge changing equipment) is Ungheni–Iași, another two are Cantemir–Fălciu and Giurgiulești–Galați. International passenger trains run to Bucharest, Kyiv, Minsk, Saint Petersburg and Moscow.

Highways 

total:

paved:

unpaved:
 (2003)

Waterways 
 (on the Dniester River) (2005). Parts fully under control of the separatist Transnistrian authorities.
a tiny access to the Danube at Giurgiulești.

Pipelines 
Natural gas  (2006)

Ports and harbors 
Moldova has one small oil terminal on the Danube at Giurgiulești (Cahul), compatible with small seagoing vessels. The harbor was opened in 2006 and occupies the entire Moldovan stretch of the river (less than ).

Merchant marine 
total: 
7 ships (1,000 GT or over) 13,831 GT/ 
by type: 
cargo 7 
foreign-owned: 
3 (Ukraine 3) (2006)

Airports 
 

12 (2006 est.). One airport (Chișinău International Airport) has commercial flights (approximately 20 destinations and 688,000 passengers in 2007).

Airports - with paved runways 
total:
7
over :
1
:
2
:
2
under :
1 (2006 est.)

Airports - with unpaved runways 
total:
6
:
3
under :
3 (2006 est.)

References